GingerMaster is malware that affects Android operating system version 2.3. It was first detected in August 2011.

History

GingerMaster is Android malware that contains a root exploit packaged within an infected app. GingerMaster's Root exploit is the "KillingInTheNameOfGingerBreakzegRush"

Process

GinegerMaster acts to be a normal application on the users phone, and once the application is launched on an Android device, it acquires root privileges through GingerBreak on the device and then accesses sensitive data. Once GingerMaster has root access it will try to install a root shell for future malicious use.

Function

GingerMaster steals data such as:

 SIM card number
 Phone number 

 IMEI number
 IMSI number
 Screen resolution 
 Native time

See also
 Brain Test
 Dendroid (Malware)
 Computer virus
 File binder
 Individual mobility
 Malware
 Trojan horse (computing)
 Worm (computing)
 Mobile operating system

References

Software distribution
Android (operating system) malware
Privilege escalation exploits
Online advertising
Mobile security
Privacy